The Apatiu is a left tributary of the river Meleș in Romania. It flows into the Meleș in Nușeni.

References

Rivers of Romania
Rivers of Bistrița-Năsăud County